A Winter Morning is a 1967 Soviet drama film directed by Nikolay Lebedev. Based on the novel by Tamara Zinberg.

Plot 
The film tells about a girl named Katya, who rescues a little boy during the bombing and decides to take him under her care in Siege of Leningrad. Suddenly, Captain Voronov, in search of his family, meets them, recognizes his son and adopts Katya.

Cast 
 Tanya Soldatenkova as Katya
 Konstantin Kornakov as Sergei
 Nikolai Timofeyev as Alexey Petrovich Voronov
 Vera Kuznetsova as aunt Tanya
 Liliya Gurova as Nina Voronova
 Fyodor Nikitin as Professor
 Yevgeny Grigoryev as house manager Ivan Lukich

References

External links 
 

1967 films
1960s Russian-language films
Soviet drama films
1967 drama films
Soviet World War II films
Lenfilm films
Soviet black-and-white films
Films based on Russian novels